The teams competing in Group 6 of the 2013 UEFA European Under-21 Championship qualifying competition were Albania, Moldova, Poland, Portugal, and Russia.

Standings

Results and fixtures

Goalscorers
6 goals
 Armando Sadiku

5 goals
 Aleksandr Kokorin

4 goals

 Rui Fonte
 Fyodor Smolov

3 goals

 Grzegorz Krychowiak
 Denis Cheryshev

2 goals

 Bekim Bala
 Artyom Khachaturov
 Artur Ioniţă
 Radu Gînsari
 Łukasz Teodorczyk
 Mateusz Klich
 Artur Sobiech
 Wilson Eduardo
 Nélson Oliveira
 Oleg Shatov

1 goal

 Mërgim Brahimi
 Elvis Prençi
 Bruno Telushi
 Gheorghe Andronic
 Anatolii Cheptine
 Ion Jardan
 Petru Leuca
 Ariel Borysiuk
 Tomasz Kupisz
 Michał Kucharczyk
 Arkadiusz Woźniak
 Salvador Agra
 Abel Camará
 André Martins
 Pedro Filipe Mendes
 João Duarte Pereira
 Josué Pesqueira
 Saná
 Shota Bibilov
 Maksim Grigoryev
 Anton Sosnin

References

External links
Standings and fixtures at UEFA.com

Group 6